Mein Vater (English: Coming Home) is a 2003 German television film directed by Andreas Kleinert.

Klaus J. Behrendt was awarded in 2003, the 'Audience Award of the Marl Group' at the Adolf Grimme Prize and the Bavarian Television Award. In addition, the film was awarded the International Emmy Award for best TV movie.

Cast 
Götz George ... Richard Esser
Klaus J. Behrendt ... Jochen Esser
Ulrike Krumbiegel ... Anja Esser
Sergej Moya ... Oliver Esser
Christine Schorn ... Karin
Nicholas Bodeux ... Jochen's friend

Awards

References

External links
 

2003 television films
2003 films
2000s German-language films
German-language television shows
German television films
International Emmy Award for Best TV Movie or Miniseries
Das Erste original programming